The provinces of Vietnam are subdivided into second-level administrative units, namely districts, provincial cities, and district-level towns. The centrally-controlled municipalities (the other first-level division, in addition to provinces) are subdivided into rural districts, district-level towns, and urban districts that are further subdivided into wards. The district (huyện) unit dates from the 15th century.

The various subdivisions (cities, towns, and districts) are listed below, by province. Cities and towns are italicised, urban districts are underlined while capital cities are bolded and italicised.

An Giang province

Bà Rịa–Vũng Tàu province

Bắc Giang province

Bắc Kạn province

Bạc Liêu province

Bắc Ninh province

Bến Tre province

Bình Định province

Bình Dương province

Bình Phước province

Bình Thuận province

Cà Mau province

Cần Thơ

Cao Bằng province
 Bảo Lạc
 Bảo Lâm
 Cao Bằng city
 Hạ Lang
 Hà Quảng
 Hòa An
 Nguyên Bình
 Quảng Hòa
 Thạch An
 Thông Nông
 Trà Lĩnh
 Trùng Khánh

Đà Nẵng
 Urban districts
 Cẩm Lệ
 Hải Châu
 Liên Chiểu
 Ngũ Hành Sơn
 Sơn Trà
 Thanh Khê
 Rural districts
 Hòa Vang
 Hoàng Sa Island

Đắk Lắk province
 Buôn Đôn
 Buôn Hồ town
 Buôn Ma Thuột city
 Cư M'gar
 Cư Kuin
 Ea H'leo
 Ea Kar
 Ea Súp
 Krông Ana
 Krông Bông
 Krông Buk
 Krông Năng
 Krông Pắk
 Lắk
 M'Đrăk

Đắk Nông province
 Cư Jút
 Đắk Glong
 Đắk Mil
 Đắk R'Lấp
 Đắk Song
 Gia Nghĩa town
 Krông Nô
 Tuy Đức

Điện Biên province
 Điện Biên
 Điện Biên Đông
 Điện Biên Phủ city
 Mường Ảng
 Mường Chà
 Mường Lay town
 Mường Nhé
 Nậm Pồ
 Tủa Chùa
 Tuần Giáo

Đồng Nai province
 Biên Hòa city
 Cẩm Mỹ
 Định Quán
 Long Khánh city
 Long Thành
 Nhơn Trạch
 Tân Phú
 Thống Nhất
 Trảng Bom
 Vĩnh Cữu
 Xuân Lộc

Đồng Tháp province
 Cao Lãnh city
 Cao Lãnh
 Châu Thành
 Hồng Ngự city
 Hồng Ngự
 Lai Vung
 Lấp Vò
 Sa Đéc city
 Tam Nông
 Tân Hồng
 Thanh Bình
 Tháp Mười

Gia Lai province
 Ayun Pa town
 An Khê town
 Chư Păh
 Chư Prông
 Chư Pưh
 Chư Sê
 Đắk Đoa
 Đắk Pơ
 Đức Cơ
 Ia Grai
 Ia Pa
 K'Bang
 Kông Chro
 Krông Pa
 Mang Yang
 Phú Thiện
 Pleiku city

Hà Giang province
 Bắc Mê
 Bắc Quang
 Đồng Văn
 Hà Giang city
 Hoàng Su Phì
 Mèo Vạc
 Quản Bạ
 Quang Bình
 Vị Xuyên
 Xín Mần
 Yên Minh

Hà Nam province
 Bình Lục
 Duy Tiên town
 Kim Bảng
 Lý Nhân
 Phủ Lý city
 Thanh Liêm

Hà Nội
 Urban districts
 Ba Đình
 Bắc Từ Liêm
 Cầu Giấy
 Đống Đa
 Hà Đông
 Hai Bà Trưng
 Hoàn Kiếm
 Hoàng Mai
 Long Biên
 Nam Từ Liêm
 Tây Hồ
 Thanh Xuân
 Town
 Sơn Tây town
 Rural districts
 Ba Vì
 Chương Mỹ
 Đan Phượng
 Đông Anh
 Gia Lâm
 Hoài Đức
 Mê Linh
 Mỹ Đức
 Phú Xuyên
 Phúc Thọ
 Quốc Oai
 Sóc Sơn
 Thạch Thất
 Thanh Oai
 Thanh Trì
 Thường Tín
 Ứng Hòa

Hà Tĩnh province
 Cẩm Xuyên
 Can Lộc
 Đức Thọ
 Hà Tĩnh city
 Hồng Lĩnh town
 Hương Khê
 Hương Sơn
 Kỳ Anh town
 Kỳ Anh
 Lộc Hà
 Nghi Xuân
 Thạch Hà
 Vũ Quang

Hải Dương province
 Bình Giang
 Cẩm Giàng
 Chí Linh city
 Gia Lộc
 Hải Dương city
 Kim Thành
 Kinh Môn town
 Nam Sách
 Ninh Giang
 Thanh Hà
 Thanh Miện
 Tứ Kỳ

Hải Phòng
 Urban districts
 Đồ Sơn
 Dương Kinh
 Hải An
 Hồng Bàng
 Kiến An
 Lê Chân
 Ngô Quyền
 Rural districts
 An Dương
 An Lão
 Bạch Long Vĩ Island
 Cát Hải Island
 Kiến Thuỵ
 Thủy Nguyên
 Tiên Lãng
 Vĩnh Bảo

Hậu Giang province
 Châu Thành
 Châu Thành A
 Long Mỹ town
 Long Mỹ
 Ngã Bảy town
 Phụng Hiệp
 Vị Thanh city
 Vị Thủy

Hồ Chí Minh City
 Municipal city
 Thủ Đức city
 Urban districts
 District 1
 District 3
 District 4
 District 5
 District 6
 District 7
 District 8
 District 10
 District 11
 District 12
 Bình Tân
 Bình Thạnh
 Gò Vấp
 Phú Nhuận
 Tân Bình
 Tân Phú
 Rural districts
 Bình Chánh
 Cần Giờ
 Củ Chi
 Hóc Môn
 Nhà Bè

Hòa Bình province
 Cao Phong
 Đà Bắc
 Hòa Bình city
 Kim Bôi
 Lạc Sơn
 Lạc Thủy
 Lương Sơn
 Mai Châu
 Tân Lạc
 Yên Thủy

Hưng Yên province
 Ân Thi
 Hưng Yên city
 Khoái Châu
 Kim Động
 Mỹ Hào town
 Phù Cừ
 Tiên Lữ
 Văn Giang
 Văn Lâm
 Yên Mỹ

Khánh Hòa province
 Cam Lâm
 Cam Ranh city
 Diên Khánh
 Khánh Sơn
 Khánh Vĩnh
 Nha Trang city
 Ninh Hòa town
 Trường Sa Island
 Vạn Ninh

Kiên Giang province
 An Biên
 An Minh
 Châu Thành
 Giang Thành
 Giồng Riềng
 Gò Quao
 Hà Tiên city
 Hòn Đất
 Kiên Hải Island
 Kiên Lương
 Phú Quốc city
 Rạch Giá city
 Tân Hiệp
 Vĩnh Thuận
 U Minh Thượng

Kon Tum province
 Đắk Glei
 Đắk Hà
 Đắk Tô
 Ia H'Drai
 Kon Plông
 Kon Rẫy
 Kon Tum city
 Ngọc Hồi
 Sa Thầy
 Tu Mơ Rông

Lai Châu province
 Lai Châu city
 Mường Tè
 Nậm Nhùn
 Phong Thổ
 Sìn Hồ
 Tam Đường
 Tân Uyên
 Than Uyên

Lâm Đồng province
 Bảo Lâm
 Bảo Lộc city
 Cát Tiên
 Đạ Huoai
 Đà Lạt city
 Đạ Tẻh
 Đam Rông
 Di Linh
 Đơn Dương
 Đức Trọng
 Lạc Dương
 Lâm Hà

Lạng Sơn province
 Bắc Sơn
 Bình Gia
 Cao Lộc
 Chi Lăng
 Đình Lập
 Hữu Lũng
 Lạng Sơn city
 Lộc Bình
 Tràng Định
 Văn Lãng
 Văn Quân

Lào Cai province
 Bắc Hà
 Bảo Thắng
 Bảo Yên
 Bát Xát
 Lào Cai city
 Mường Khương
 Sa Pa town
 Si Ma Cai
 Văn Bàn

Long An province
 Bến Lức
 Cần Đước
 Cần Giuộc
 Châu Thành
 Đức Hòa
 Đức Huệ
 Kiến Tường town
 Mộc Hóa
 Tân An city
 Tân Hưng
 Tân Thạnh
 Tân Trụ
 Thạnh Hóa
 Thủ Thừa
 Vĩnh Hưng

Nam Định province
 Giao Thủy
 Hải Hậu
 Mỹ Lộc
 Nam Định city
 Nam Trực
 Nghĩa Hưng
 Trực Ninh
 Vụ Bản
 Xuân Trường
 Ý Yên

Nghệ An province
 Anh Sơn
 Con Cuông
 Cửa Lò town
 Diễn Châu
 Đô Lương
 Hoàng Mai town
 Hưng Nguyên
 Kỳ Sơn
 Nam Đàn
 Nghi Lộc
 Nghĩa Đàn
 Quế Phong
 Quỳ Châu
 Quỳ Hợp
 Quỳnh Lưu
 Tân Kỳ
 Thái Hòa town
 Thanh Chương
 Tương Dương
 Vinh city
 Yên Thành

Ninh Bình province
 Gia Viễn
 Hoa Lư
 Kim Sơn
 Nho Quan
 Ninh Bình city
 Tam Điệp city
 Yên Khánh
 Yên Mô

Ninh Thuận province
 Bác Ái
 Ninh Hải
 Ninh Phước
 Ninh Sơn
 Phan Rang–Tháp Chàm city
 Thuận Bắc
 Thuận Nam

Phú Thọ province
 Cẩm Khê
 Đoan Hùng
 Hạ Hòa
 Lâm Thao
 Phù Ninh
 Phú Thọ town
 Tam Nông
 Tân Sơn
 Thanh Ba
 Thanh Sơn
 Thanh Thủy
 Việt Trì city
 Yên Lập

Phú Yên province
 Đông Hòa town
 Đồng Xuân
 Phú Hòa
 Sơn Hòa
 Sông Cầu town
 Sông Hinh
 Tây Hòa
 Tuy An
 Tuy Hòa city

Quảng Bình province
 Ba Đồn town
 Bố Trạch
 Đồng Hới city
 Lệ Thủy
 Minh Hóa
 Quảng Ninh
 Quảng Trạch
 Tuyên Hóa

Quảng Nam province
 Bắc Trà My
 Đại Lộc
 Điện Bàn town
 Đông Giang
 Duy Xuyên
 Hiệp Đức
 Hội An city
 Nam Giang
 Nam Trà My
 Nông Sơn
 Núi Thành
 Phước Sơn
 Quế Sơn
 Tam Kỳ city
 Tây Giang
 Thăng Bình
 Tiên Phước

Quảng Ngãi province
 Ba Tơ
 Bình Sơn
 Đức Phổ town
 Lý Sơn Island
 Minh Long
 Mộ Đức
 Nghĩa Hành
 Quảng Ngãi city
 Sơn Hà
 Sơn Tây
 Sơn Tịnh
 Tây Trà
 Trà Bồng
 Tư Nghĩa

Quảng Ninh province
 Ba Chẽ
 Bình Liêu
 Cẩm Phả city
 Cô Tô Island
 Đầm Hà
 Đông Triều town
 Hạ Long city
 Hải Hà
 Hoành Bồ
 Móng Cái city
 Quảng Yên town
 Tiên Yên
 Uông Bí city
 Vân Đồn Island

Quảng Trị province
 Cam Lộ
 Cồn Cỏ Island
 Đa Krông
 Đông Hà city
 Gio Linh
 Hải Lăng
 Hướng Hóa
 Quảng Trị town
 Triệu Phong
 Vĩnh Linh

Sóc Trăng province
 Châu Thành
 Cù Lao Dung
 Long Phú
 Kế Sách
 Mỹ Tú
 Mỹ Xuyên
 Ngã Năm town
 Sóc Trăng city
 Thạnh Trị
  Trần Đề
 Vĩnh Châu town

Sơn La province
 Bắc Yên
 Mai Sơn
 Mộc Châu
 Mường La
 Phù Yên
 Quỳnh Nhai
 Sơn La city
 Sông Mã
 Sốp Cộp
 Thuận Châu
 Vân Hồ
 Yên Châu

Tây Ninh province
 Bến Cầu
 Châu Thành
 Dương Minh Châu
 Gò Dầu
 Hòa Thành town
 Tân Biên
 Tân Châu
 Tây Ninh city
 Trảng Bàng town

Thái Bình province
 Đông Hưng
 Hưng Hà
 Kiến Xương
 Quỳnh Phụ
 Thái Bình city
 Thái Thụy
 Tiền Hải
 Vũ Thư

Thái Nguyên province
 Đại Từ
 Định Hóa
 Đồng Hỷ
 Phổ Yên city
 Phú Bình
 Phú Lương
 Sông Công city
 Thái Nguyên city
 Võ Nhai

Thanh Hóa province
 Bá Thước
 Bỉm Sơn town
 Cẩm Thủy
 Đông Sơn
 Hà Trung
 Hậu Lộc
 Hoằng Hóa
 Lang Chánh
 Mường Lát
 Nga Sơn
Nghi Sơn town
 Ngọc Lặc
 Như Thanh
 Như Xuân
 Nông Cống
 Quan Hóa
 Quan Sơn
 Quảng Xương
 Sầm Sơn city
 Thạch Thành
 Thanh Hóa city
 Thiệu Hóa
 Thọ Xuân
 Thường Xuân
 Triệu Sơn
 Vĩnh Lộc
 Yên Định

Thừa Thiên–Huế province
 A Lưới
 Huế city
 Hương Thủy town
 Hương Trà town
 Nam Đông
 Phong Điền
 Phú Lộc
 Phú Vang
 Quảng Điền

Tiền Giang province
 Cái Bè
 Cai Lậy town
 Cai Lậy
 Châu Thành
 Chợ Gạo
 Gò Công town
 Gò Công Dông
 Gò Công Tây
 Mỹ Tho city
 Tân Phú Đông
 Tân Phước

Trà Vinh province
 Càng Long
 Cầu Kè
 Cầu Ngang
 Châu Thành
 Duyên Hải town
 Duyên Hải
 Tiểu Cần
 Trà Cú
 Trà Vinh city

Tuyên Quang province
 Chiêm Hóa
 Hàm Yên
 Lâm Bình
 Nà Hang
 Sơn Dương
 Tuyên Quang city
 Yên Sơn

Vĩnh Long province
 Bình Minh town
 Bình Tân
 Long Hồ
 Mang Thít
 Tâm Bình
 Trà Ôn
 Vĩnh Long city
 Vũng Liêm

Vĩnh Phúc province
 Bình Xuyên
 Lập Thạch
 Phúc Yên city
 Sông Lô
 Tam Đảo
 Tam Dương
 Vĩnh Tường
 Vĩnh Yên city
 Yên Lạc

Yên Bái province
 Lục Yên
 Mù Cang Chải
 Nghĩa Lộ town
 Trạm Tấu
 Trấn Yên
 Văn Chấn
 Văn Yên
 Yên Bái city
 Yên Bình

References
 Districts of Vietnam

 
Subdivisions of Vietnam
Districts
Vietnam 2
Districts, Vietnam
Districts